US Bougouni is a Malian football club. The team is based in the city of Bougouni.

They are the first second-division team to win the Malian Cup.

Achievements
 Malien Cup: 1
 2012

Performance in CAF competitions
CAF Confederation Cup: 1 appearance
2013 –

Football clubs in Mali